The Men's 50 metre pistol singles event took place at 6 October 2010 at the CRPF Campus. There were two qualification rounds held to determine the final participants.

Results

External links
Report

Shooting at the 2010 Commonwealth Games